Jana Bohumila Wendt (born 9 May 1956) is an Australian Gold Logie award-winning television journalist, reporter and writer.

Early life
Wendt was born in Melbourne to Czech parents who emigrated to Australia in 1949, as political refugees on account of her father’s work as a journalist for a Czech dissident newspaper.

Wendt attended Presentation College, Windsor before graduating at the University of Melbourne with a Bachelor of Arts (French, Honours) in 1979.

Career
Starting as a researcher for the ABC, Wendt's television career began as a journalist for ATV-10 evening news, before sharing presenting duties with David Johnston.

In 1982, Wendt then went on to be one of the first reporters on the Australian Nine Network's version of 60 Minutes, as well as filing stories for the American CBS 60 Minutes.

Wendt took over in 1997 as host of A Current Affair, also on Nine, until November 1992, and was host of Australian Dateline on SBS and Witness on Seven.

She also did a number of specials for the ABC. She returned to Channel Nine in 2003 to host Sunday.

Departure from Nine Network
Rumours of Wendt's departure from Nine began in June 2006, when the network announced it would merge its Sunday and Business Sunday programs. Leaks to the print media, reportedly from high levels within Nine and described by journalists as "ham-fisted", revealed that the network wanted to replace Wendt with Ellen Fanning. Then CEO Eddie McGuire in particular was accused of trying to "white-ant" Wendt. On 1 September 2006 it was announced that Wendt would leave the Nine Network. News reports suggested she would receive a payout of more than A$2 million in lieu of the remaining two and a half years of her contract.

The absence of Wendt on the Sunday program's relaunch on 3 September 2006 was met with an unprecedented number of complaints that flooded the Nine Network's switchboard.

Wendt was then sacked from her regular "Lunch" column for The Bulletin magazine, due to the association the magazine has with the Nine Network; both had the same parent company, PBL.

On 12 September 2006, just ten days after she left the Nine Network, Wendt agreed to appear on stage at the Seven Network's 50 Years of Television presentation, where she co-presented the News and Current Affairs section with Sydney news presenter Ian Ross, another former Nine Network employee.

Delivering the second Andrew Olle Media Lecture in 1997, Wendt said of the profession:

Wendt presented the Logies Hall of Fame award to the program 60 Minutes at the 2018 Logies.

Personal life
Wendt married producer Brendan Ward in 1984 and they have one son, Daniel.

In 2004, a painting of Wendt by artist Evert Ploeg won the Packing Room Prize at the Archibald Prize.

Awards
Wendt won the 1992 Gold Logie Award for her role as host of A Current Affair. She was not at the presentation to accept her award, citing commitments to A Current Affair, based in Sydney, while the awards were being presented in Melbourne.

Wendt won a Lifetime Achievement Award at the 2018 Kennedy Awards.

Books published
 A Matter of Principle, Melbourne University Press, 2007. .
 Nice Work, Melbourne University Press, 2010.

References

External links 
 Wendt's 1997 Andrew Olle Media Lecture

1956 births
Nine News presenters
10 News First presenters
Australian people of Czech descent
Gold Logie winners
Living people
Journalists from Melbourne
Australian broadcast news analysts
University of Melbourne alumni
Australian television talk show hosts
60 Minutes correspondents
60 Minutes (Australian TV program) correspondents